Flowers for Vases / Descansos (stylized as FLOWERS for VASES / descansos) is the second studio album by American singer-songwriter and Paramore frontwoman Hayley Williams. It was released without prior announcement through Atlantic Records on February 5, 2021, nine months after its predecessor Petals for Armor (2020), and two months after the extended play Petals for Armor: Self-Serenades (2020). Departing from the art pop sound of the singer's previous material, Flowers for Vases is an intimate folk album with sparse guitars, piano chords, and spare drums.

Background
After the release of Petals for Armor: Self-Serenades in December 2020, which includes a demo for "Find Me Here", Williams's website started redirecting to the Flowers for Vases webpage playing 15-second demo tracks of the project songs on January 22, 2021. On January 29, she started sending gifts to fans, including body parts of a doll with the note "Plant Me", and a special package including a Sanctuary candle and a CD with "My Limb", asking for fans to leak the song. Williams stated that the album is her own equivalent of Taylor Swift's Folklore (2020).

On February 4, Williams announced Flowers for Vases / Descansos via social media a day before its release, including the album's credits, also explaining that the album serves as a prequel or "detour" from her first studio album Petals for Armor.

Critical reception

Flowers for Vases / Descansos was met with positive reviews from music critics. At Metacritic, which assigns a normalized score out of 100 to ratings from publications, the album received an average score of 79 based on 15 reviews, indicating "generally favorable reviews".

Track listing
All songs were written by Hayley Williams and produced by Daniel James.

Personnel
 Hayley Williams – all instruments, all vocals, writer
 Daniel James – producer, engineer
 Carlos de la Garza – mixing
 Heba Kadry – mastering
 Denyse Tontz – mix engineering assistant
 Lindsey Byrnes – creative direction, photography

Charts

References

2021 albums
Hayley Williams albums
Atlantic Records albums
Surprise albums
Albums recorded in a home studio
 Folk albums by American artists